Asian Sailing Federation (ASAF) is the Asia's governing body for the sport of sailing recognised by the Olympic Council of Asia (OCA) and the World Sailing (WS).

Events 
 Asian Sailing Championship
 Sailing at the Asian Games

References

External links 
 Official website

Sports governing bodies in Asia
Sailing in Asia